is a private university in Japan. It is located in Machida, Tokyo.

Wako University is part of a comprehensive educational institute called Wako-Gakuen (和光学園) (meaning Wako schools), that includes kindergarten, two elementary schools, junior high school and high school. All schools are located in Tokyo. The university has direct attached schools, so that people who have attended from the elementary school are relatively wealthy and then they directly go to the university without taking an examination.

History
Wako University was founded in 1966 as a four-year liberal arts institution of higher learning. Wako's founder and first president, Dr. Satoru Umene, was a pioneering educator who led the postwar movement to reform Japanese higher education.

Controversy
In 2004, Wako University accepted one applicant, however, upon learning that the applicant was the daughter of Shoko Asahara, the mastermind behind the Sarin gas attack on the Tokyo subway, they rescinded her acceptance. This was a controversial event and an assistant professor, Eiji Otsuka, resigned in protest. The president of the university at the time, Osamu Mitsuhashi, was a professor of sociology who had recently published the book "Notes of Discrimination". In end, the university was sentenced by Tokyo District Court to pay a fine of ￥300,000 (US$2,500).

Undergraduate departments

Faculty of Human Sciences
Psychology and Education
Sociological Studies
Human and Environmental Well-being

Faculty of Representational studies
Transcultural studies
Art

Faculty of Economics and Business Management
Economics
Business and Media

Graduate department
Social and Cultural Studies

Faculty

See also

References

External links
 Wako University (English is available)

 
Private universities and colleges in Japan
Machida, Tokyo
1966 establishments in Japan
Educational institutions established in 1966